Eagle Creek is a tributary of the Columbia River in Multnomah and Hood River counties in the U.S. state of Oregon. It cuts through a narrow canyon in its  descent to the Columbia River Gorge and is known for its concentration of 13 waterfalls in about  distance. Eight major falls are on Eagle Creek and the East Fork Eagle Creek itself, while five are on its tributaries.

The waterfalls are described with most downstream (northerly) first and proceeding upstream along Eagle Creek.

Eagle Creek and East Fork

Metlako Falls

Metlako Falls, which takes its name from the Indian goddess of salmon, is an  punchbowl waterfall. The falls drop out of a narrow and calm stream pool along Eagle Creek, and shoot powerfully out into the narrow canyon. Despite its great height, the falls have been run before by experienced kayakers.

Metlako Falls is at coordinates .

Lower Punch Bowl Falls
Lower Punch Bowl Falls is the smaller downstream counterpart of the famous upstream Punch Bowl Falls. The falls is a popular study for photography, though a stretch of Eagle Creek upstream and Punch Bowl Falls itself are far more popular subjects.

Lower Punch Bowl Falls is at coordinates .

Punch Bowl Falls

Punch Bowl Falls is a  punchbowl, hence the name, just upstream of Lower Punch Bowl Falls, and is an incredibly popular subject of photography. This waterfall was responsible for the waterfall classification of "punchbowl".

Punch Bowl Falls is at coordinates .

Skoonichuk Falls
Skoonichuk Falls takes its name from the Chinook Indian word meaning evil spirit.

Skoonichuk Falls is at coordinates .

Grand Union Falls
Grand Union Falls, also called Grand Junction Falls or Blue Grouse Falls, is an often overlooked waterfall on Eagle Creek just below the famed Tunnel Falls. It is similar in appearance, geology and form to Sevenmile Falls not too far upstream. The cliff it flows over consists of the same columnar basalt that is very common in the Columbia River Gorge area.

Grand Union Falls is at coordinates .

Tunnel Falls
Tunnel Falls is the only known waterfall on the East Fork Eagle Creek, with a sheer plunge of  into a narrow bowl. The falls takes its name from this tunnel. The waterfall is actually on the East Fork Eagle Creek, not on Eagle Creek itself, but the East Fork is a substantial stream and Tunnel Falls is often associated with Eagle Creek anyway.

Tunnel Falls is at coordinates .

Twister Falls

It begins with a small plunge, then some cascades over bulbous rocks. It ends with a plunge of  into a large basin below the falls. Crisscross Falls, Crossover Falls, Bowtie Falls, and Eagle Creek Falls are all accepted alternate names for this waterfall.

Twister Falls is at coordinates .

Sevenmile Falls
Sevenmile Falls is the uppermost known major waterfall along Eagle Creek, and is very similar in form and appearance to Grand Union Falls above. The falls drop  over columnar basalt, ending in a modest pool. The falls were named for being near the  mark (river mile 7) of Eagle Creek, but is also known as Upper Eagle Creek Falls.

Sevenmile Falls is at coordinates .

Tributary waterfalls

Wauna Falls
Wauna Falls is a relatively hidden waterfall on a small, unnamed tributary of Eagle Creek well downstream from the first major waterfall, Metlako Falls.

Wauna Falls is at coordinates .

Sorenson Falls
Sorenson Falls is a waterfall near Metlako Falls, dropping about  into the canyon nearly parallel with it. Unfortunately, the falls are mostly obstructed by foliage and cannot be seen clearly from the Eagle Creek trail.

Sorenson Falls is at coordinates .

Loowit Falls
The falls has one main tier that drops into a nearly perfectly round pool, before cascading into Eagle Creek. Loowit Falls takes its name from Loowit, an old woman in local Indian tribe lore who tended an eternal fire burning on the Bridge of the Gods, and who transformed into Mount St. Helens upon her death.

Loowit Falls is at coordinates .

Tenas Falls
Tenas Falls is a rather non-notable waterfall on an unnamed stream that joins Eagle Creek just above Skoonichuk Falls. It skips about  down a small ledge in two tiers. Tenas Falls takes its name from a Chinookan word meaning "small".

Tenas Falls is at coordinates .

Wy'east Falls

Wy'east Falls is a  plunge along a small tributary of Eagle Creek. Like so many of the other waterfalls along Eagle Creek, it plunges over the Columbia River Gorge basalt formation. The falls takes its name from Wy'east, the Native American name for Mount Hood.

Wy'east Falls is at coordinates .

Access

All the waterfalls along Eagle Creek are accessed along the Eagle Creek Trail, which is a creatively constructed trail that leads from the Historic Columbia River Highway upstream along Eagle Creek, passing by several campsites. The trail leads  to Punch Bowl Falls and continues a further  to Tunnel Falls.

References

Waterfalls of Hood River County, Oregon
Mount Hood National Forest
Waterfalls of Oregon